Sandhills Horticultural Gardens (27 acres) are gardens and natural areas located on the campus of Sandhills Community College, 3395 Airport Road, Pinehurst, North Carolina, in the United States. They are open to the public daily without charge.

The gardens include a formal garden in the English style, collections of conifers and holly, a native wetland trail, a fruit and vegetable garden, roses, azaleas, rhododendrons, and a xeriscape devoted to cacti, yuccas, and other succulents.

See also
 List of botanical gardens in the United States

Botanical gardens in North Carolina
Protected areas of Moore County, North Carolina